Bob, Agent of Hydra (Robert Dobalina), is a fictional character appearing in American comic books published by Marvel Comics. The character is depicted as an antihero and a sidekick of Deadpool. A former member of the terrorist agency Hydra, he defected to help Wade Wilson, but has kept his Hydra uniform.

Bob had a cameo in the 2016 feature film Deadpool where he was portrayed by Rob Hayter.

Publication history
Bob first appeared in Cable & Deadpool #38 (May 2007) and was created by writer Fabian Nicieza and artist Reilly Brown.

Fictional character biography
A cowardly young man, Bob was persuaded to join the criminal organization Hydra by his wife, Allison, who accused him of not being able to hold a steady job. The thought of a stable career with a dental plan also appealed to Bob, though he was disappointed to find out Hydra does not offer full dental like Advanced Idea Mechanics (AIM). During Deadpool's assault on Hydra to rescue the captured Agent X, he ran into Bob and coerced Bob into helping him. Bob was hesitant, as Hydra would not allow him back into the organization after having betrayed them, but Deadpool, at the time four inches tall, tortured him with a security card until he relented. He then forced Bob to fly them to safety in one of Hydra's jets, though Bob did not know how to pilot an aircraft.

After Deadpool, Agent X, and Bob returned to the United States, they found Outlaw and Sandi missing. Bob accompanied Deadpool on his mission to save the girls and subsequently became an honorary member of Agency X. He continues to work with the group on their various missions, and is referred to as Deadpool's "Minion" (or "Pet"). During a raid on the very same Hydra base Deadpool kidnapped him from, in an attempt to save Weasel from Wolverine, Bob was shot in the leg. Weasel had been left behind in the raid Bob had been picked up on. Deadpool knew that, when Wolverine targeted the base, Weasel's chances for survival were slim. When Wolverine cuts off Deadpool's head, Bob put it back in order to let Deadpool's healing factor take effect.  At the end of the incident, most of Bob's former co-workers are slain. Weasel sends the rest to prison using teleportation technology. Weasel saves the others with the teleportation technology but it later malfunctions. Deadpool and Bob are sent into the past, where they aid Captain America and Bucky in stopping Arnim Zola. Following that adventure, Bob accompanied Deadpool on a mission through various dimensions to help Doctor Strange save reality after it was damaged by T-Ray's novice magic.

Bob also traveled with Deadpool and Weasel to the Savage Land, where he ran away from an assortment of dinosaurs. Deadpool attempted to teleport the dinos to Genosha as a prank on Magneto, but instead they were sent to the Genoshan Embassy in downtown Manhattan, being infected with the alien Symbiotes responsible for Venom and Carnage. During the resultant battle, Bob's attempt to flee accidentally caused the death of one of the creatures while a news crew watched. Thinking his actions were intentional, they interviewed Bob who claimed the 'H' on his uniform stood for "Hero". He then received a text message from Allison who had seen the events on the news and thought it was hot. Bob is seen watching television with Deadpool and his supporting cast as the series ends.

Bob is later seen assisting Deadpool defeat Tiger Shark. When Deadpool tells Bob to throw him a rifle, Bob does not throw it far enough. The rifle falls into the water, where Tiger Shark is waiting, and Bob is knocked into the water. Deadpool saves Bob at the last second and they are able to outmaneuver Tiger Shark for a while, although Bob is shot in the hand by Deadpool. Bob explains to Deadpool that he along with Tiger Shark were hired by Norman Osborn. Deadpool soon realizes Green Goblin stole from him during the height of the Secret Invasion against the Skrulls.

Later, Bob is called upon by Deadpool to join him in becoming a pirate. Bob abandons his wife to answer the call. Due to severe beatings, he gets stuck as Deadpool's parrot. With Deadpool's lack of navigational skills they become lost at sea for six weeks and Bob develops scurvy (or possibly heat stroke). Bob attempts to gain help from Kalani, a blind, beautiful information clerk on Jallarka, a tropical island the two were planning to 'pirate'. Bob is pleased to be forced to spend time with this lady when Deadpool's insanity causes him to demand her platonic companionship in exchange for saving the island from other pirates. She is pleased to make this exchange. The three work together and kill all the pirates thanks to a nuclear submarine Deadpool had previously bought and sunk. Kalani falls for Bob and asks him to stay behind with her but his husbandly loyalty is too strong. However, he is forced to stay behind as Deadpool abandons Bob and Kalani with a crateful of gold and musings on how he wants to help people instead of rob them.

During the World War Hulks storyline, Bob uses a time platform to send Hulkpool (a gamma-powered Deadpool) back in time to kill Deadpool. Unfortunately, it sends him to an alternate reality where Thing is Blackbeard. Bob tries to correct the mistakes and ends up transporting dinosaurs to that reality. Further mistakes in that timeline cause Bob to be revered as an all-powerful god by the entirety of modern-day Earth.

Bob gets on the wrong side of a gang war between Tombstone and the Kingpin. Desperate to save his friend's life, Deadpool battles X-Force, who were trying to take him down. They agree to leave Deadpool alone when they realize he is simply trying to save Bob.

Bob assists Deadpool when an old enemy threatens all of reality. Disposing of 'T-Ray' had caused magical breakage through multiple realms, so Doctor Strange sends Deadpool and Bob through said realms; their mission requires a monster slain in each one. Deadpool usually ends up saving Bob's life in each realm as well.

After two years of absence, Deadpool again calls upon Bob to help secure an escape route for him and Shiklah. Despite initially being offended by Deadpool's long absence, he agrees to help, somehow getting a HYDRA Carrier to kidnap (thus, saving) the couple. However, the trio gets kidnapped by MODOK, interested in Shiklah's succubus powers.

They manage to escape, but in the process Bob gets his legs badly crushed and, as Shiklah pleads for his safety, Deadpool agrees to dump him to a veterinary clinic at first, then a real hospital. He recovers enough to help Deadpool fend off Dracula's forces, using a stolen MODOK's chair to move around in his broken legs. He eventually manages to make a full recovery, attending Wade and Shiklah's wedding.

Much later, a mysterious conspiracy draws in those Deadpool cares for. This garners Bob a severe beating.

Later, Bob is a host for a returned Madcap, partially regenerated after vaporizing himself. He imbedded himself inside Bob, and forced Bob to assist him in his revenge against Deadpool. Madcap then tore himself from Bob to attach to Deadpool. 

Bob is again working for Deadpool. Wade Wilson had erased several years of his own memory, due to highly unpleasant incidents. Bob assists Negasonic Teenage Warhead in taking Deadpool to the physics-defying realm of 'Weirdworld'. Bob was able to rig a communication system that mostly ignored the weirdness of Weirdworld.

Powers and abilities
Bob has no superpowers and does not have training in any combat or tactical skills. The training Hydra gives its minions seems primarily focused on running away and hiding when confronted with danger, making Bob a parody of the cannon-fodder henchmen frequently seen working for evil organizations in comic books. Even this training seems useless, as Bob has cited such Hydra lessons as "Hiding behind each other" and "If I can't see them they can't see me." Deadpool has said that Bob is better at running away than anyone he has seen.

Bob has a pathological fear ingrained in him of certain characters who are particularly devastating enemies of Hydra. Among these are Captain America, Wolverine, and Elektra. Notably, Bob has mentioned Hydra specifically trains their minions to flee as quickly as possible upon hearing the distinctive "snikt" sound of Wolverine's claws. When stressed he has a tendency to shout "Hail Hydra!" and other propaganda of the organization such as "Cut off one head and two more will take its place!"

Despite his incompetence, Bob sometimes gets lucky. He was able to fly a plane a long distance despite having no knowledge of how to do so, and killed a Symbiote-possessed dinosaur by accident while fleeing from it. He was also able to save Deadpool's life during a battle with Wolverine by staying put to reattach his head despite his cowardice. Even though he is useless in a fight, Deadpool seems to delight in taking him on dangerous missions, seemingly for his own amusement. Bob goes along with him, although it is unclear whether this is because he is afraid of Wade or genuinely considers him a friend - or because he's a committed minion and does not know what else to do.

Despite his shortcomings and his cowardice, Bob's strength lies in him being a dedicated friend, challenging his own fears to help his friends.

Reception

Accolades 

 In 2021, CBR.com ranked Bob, Agent of Hydra 10th in their "10 Smartest Marvel Sidekicks" list.
 In 2022, Newsarama ranked Bob, Agent of Hydra 6th in their "Best superhero sidekicks of all time" list.

Other versions

Identity Wars 
In an alternate universe visited by Deadpool, Hulk and Spider-Man, Bob is a red-suited lackey of that version of Wade Wilson, a powered crime lord of New York City. Feeling the need to eliminate his rival's murderous empire, Deadpool kills his way through his counterpart's men; Bob gets flattened under an I-beam.

Marvel Max 
In Deadpool Max, Bob is a CIA agent and the reluctant handler of the deranged Deadpool, charged with keeping up the facade that the missions Deadpool is assigned all somehow involve taking down the entirely fictional terrorist organization Hydra. In this continuity, Bob is extremely competent at his job. His biggest weakness is any woman who shows a romantic or sexual interest in him, even if they are paid to.

In other media

Film

 A variation of Bob appears in the 2016 live-action feature film Deadpool, portrayed by Rob Hayter. Due to 21st Century Fox holding the rights to Deadpool and Marvel Studios holding the rights to Hydra at the time, this version works as one of Ajax's henchmen, is stated to have a wife named Gail and kids, and previously knew Deadpool from a past encounter. While attempting to rescue Vanessa from Ajax, Deadpool recognizes and has a brief conversation with Bob before knocking him out.

Video games
 Bob appears in Deadpool's ending in Ultimate Marvel vs. Capcom 3.
 Bob appears as an optional mini-boss in Chapter 1 of the Marvel Heroes.
 Bob appears in Marvel: Avengers Alliance.
 Bob appears as a companion in Marvel Future Revolution.
 Bob appears in a cutscene in Marvel's Midnight Suns.

References

External links
 Bob, Agent of Hydra at Marvel.com
 Bob (Hydra Agent) at the Marvel Database Project
 

Characters created by Fabian Nicieza
Marvel Comics sidekicks
Comics characters introduced in 2007
Deadpool characters
Fictional mercenaries in comics
Hydra (comics) agents
X-Men supporting characters